Cognitive behavioral therapy encompasses many therapeutical approaches, techniques and systems.
 Acceptance and commitment therapy was developed by Steven C. Hayes and others based in part on relational frame theory and has been called a "third wave" cognitive behavioral therapy.
 Anxiety management training was developed by Suinn and Richardson (1971) for helping clients control their anxiety by the use of relaxation and other skills.
 Aversion therapy, developed by Hans Eysenck 
 Behavior therapy
 Behavioral activation is a behavioral approach to treating depression, developed by Neil Jacobson and others.
 Cognitive therapy was developed by Aaron Beck.
 Cognitive analytic therapy
 Cognitive behavioral analysis system of psychotherapy
 Cognitive emotional behavioral therapy 
 Cognitive processing therapy for Post traumatic stress disorder
 Compassion focused therapy
 Computerised cognitive behavioral therapy
 Contingency management
 Counterconditioning
 Decoupling
 Desensitization
 Dialectical behavior therapy
 Direct therapeutic exposure
 Exposure and response prevention
 Exposure therapy
 Functional analytic psychotherapy
 Habit Reversal Training
 Metacognitive therapy
 Metacognitive training
 Mindfulness-based cognitive therapy
 Multimodal therapy
 Problem-solving therapy
 Prolonged exposure therapy
 Rational emotive behavior therapy, formerly called rational therapy and rational emotive therapy, was founded by Albert Ellis.
 Reality therapy
 Relapse prevention
 Schema therapy
 Self-control therapy
 Self-instructional training was developed by Donald Meichenbaum, influenced by the developmental psychology of Alexander Luria and Lev Vygotsky, designed to treat the mediational deficiencies of impulsive children.
 Stress inoculation training
 Systematic desensitization is an anxiety reduction technique, developed by Joseph Wolpe.
 Systematic rational restructuring was an attempt by Marvin Goldfried to reanalyze systematic desensitization in terms of cognitive mediation and coping skills.

See also 
 List of therapies
 List of psychotherapies

Notes 

 
Cognitive-behavioral therapy
Cognitive science lists